"Now She Knows She's Wrong" is a song by the American power pop group Jellyfish. It is the fourth single released in support of their 1990 debut album Bellybutton.

Formats and track listing 
European 7" single (CUSS 3)
"Now She Knows She's Wrong" – 4:35
"Bedspring Kiss" – 5:02
"She Still Loves Him" (live) – 4:11
"Baby's Coming Back" (live) – 2:57

European 12" single (Cust 3)
"Now She Knows She's Wrong" – 4:35
"Bedspring Kiss" – 5:02
"The Man I Used to Be" (live) – 4:46
"Calling Sarah" (live) – 4:02

European CD single (CUSCD 3)
"Now She Knows She's Wrong" – 4:35
"Bedspring Kiss" – 5:02
"Let 'Em In"/"That Is Why" (live) – 4:56
"The King Is Half-Undressed" (live) – 3:43

Charts

References

External links 
 

1990 songs
1991 singles
Jellyfish (band) songs
Charisma Records singles
Song recordings produced by Jack Joseph Puig
Songs written by Andy Sturmer
Song recordings produced by Albhy Galuten
Songs written by Roger Joseph Manning Jr.